James Howick (born 14 May 1979) is an English actor and writer, known for his appearances in television series such as Peep Show, Horrible Histories, Stag, Ghosts and Here We Go.

Early life

Howick was born in Chichester, West Sussex on 14 May 1979. He was educated at The Regis School. He graduated with First Class Honours from Mountview Academy of Theatre Arts in 2000.

Career
Along with the five other members of the Horrible Histories starring cast, which includes Ben Willbond, Martha Howe-Douglas, Mathew Baynton, Simon Farnaby and Laurence Rickard, Howick is also the co-creator, -writer and -star of Yonderland, an eight-part family fantasy comedy series that premiered on SkyOne on 10 November 2013. He co-starred with the same troupe in Bill, a BBC-produced comedy film based loosely around the early life of William Shakespeare. Other prominent television roles include Gerard in Peep Show, Gerry in Danny Boyle's Babylon and Anthony in the revival of Reggie Perrin. In addition he has been a regular guest star in various sketch comedies, including The Armstrong and Miller Show and The Kevin Bishop Show. In 2017 he played Aaron Mayford in the ITV thriller Broadchurch. Since 2019, Howick has starred in the Netflix original series Sex Education as Mr Hendricks, a science teacher at Moordale Secondary School who also conducts the Swing Band. Howick is the co-creator, co-writer and co-star of the BBC One sitcom Ghosts, - Howick plays numerous characters, but is mostly known for his role as Patrick Butcher, a 1980s Scout Master who was killed in an archery accident - the show was first broadcast in 2019 and has been renewed for a 5th series.  More recently, Howick was cast in the 2022 BBC comedy series “Here We Go" in which he plays Paul Jessop.

In film, Howick played Cpl. Matlin in the Guillermo del Toro adaptation of Hellboy.

Filmography

Film

Television

Awards 
In 2010, Howick won a Children's BAFTA for his performance in the second series of the CBBC television series Horrible Histories.

References

External links

1979 births
Living people
English male film actors
English male television actors
English male voice actors
20th-century English male actors
21st-century English male actors
People from Chichester
BAFTA winners (people)